Sítio do Picapau Amarelo, is a 1997 platforming video game developed by Tectoy for the Sega Master System. It was based on the eponymous series broadcast in the 1970s, which in turn was based on the novel series by Monteiro Lobato. As Férias Frustradas do Pica-Pau it was released in Brazil only.

Gameplay
The player chooses whether to play Pete or Emilia in the game. Both should go the way jumping on platforms and defeating enemies throwing objects on them, Pete with a slingshot and Emilia only stones. Throughout the game they lose points lives they can restore freeing caged birds along the way. However it has a very heavy control that impedes the player to give high jumps.

Plot
When the cook Aunt Anastacia gets sick, Pete and Emilia receive a mission to find the 5 ingredients to be able to cure her, venturing through forests found with creatures of folklore.

External links

Sítio do Picapau Amarelo at the Sega Brazil wiki

Platform games
1997 video games
Brazil-exclusive video games
Master System games
Master System-only games
Video games developed in Brazil
Video games set in Brazil
Sítio do Picapau Amarelo